Keerthi Reddy is an Indian former actress who appeared primarily in Telugu, Tamil, and Hindi language films. Her notable work includes Tholi Prema (1998), Pyaar Ishq Aur Mohabbat (2001) and Arjun (2004). She has received a Filmfare Award for her performance in the film Arjun (2004).

Early life
Keerthi Reddy was born to an interior designer and dress designer mother. Her grandfather is Keshpally Ganga Reddy, Ex-Member of Parliament from Nizamabad in Telangana. She was raised in Bengaluru. She did her schooling in Jiddu Krishnamurthy's The Valley School near Kanakapura, Bengaluru. She was trained in Bharatanatyam for eight years. She briefly studied at St. Joseph's Public School in Hyderabad. She attended Ryerson University for higher education.

Career
In 1996, Keerthi Reddy made her film début in a comedy thriller Gunshot, opposite Ali directed by S. V. Krishna Reddy. In 1998 Keerthi was cast as female lead in Tholi Prema opposite Pawan Kalyan which was a blockbuster. In 2000 Keerthi Reddy made her Bollywood début in Tera Jadoo Chal Gayaa opposite Abhishek Bachchan. Her next film Pyaar Ishq Aur Mohabbat featured her as Isha Nair opposite the debutant Arjun Rampal. Her role was a girl who was loved by three men Gaurav Saxena, Yash Sabarwal (Suniel Shetty) and Taj Bharadwaj (Aftab Shivdasani). In 2002 Keerthi had a supporting role in Badhaai Ho Badhaai opposite Anil Kapoor. After these films, she stopped acting in Hindi films.

In 2002 Keerthi Reddy acted in Super Star, her only Kannada film. In 2004 Keerthi Reddy acted in the Telugu film Arjun starring Mahesh Babu for which she received her only award, a Filmfare Best Supporting Actress Award in Telugu.

Personal life
Keerthi married actor Sumanth, Nagarjuna Akkineni's nephew and the grandson of ANR in 2004. They divorced in 2006. She later remarried and settled in United States. The couple has two children.

Filmography

See also

 List of Indian Actors

References

External links 
 

Actresses in Tamil cinema
Actresses from Hyderabad, India
Living people
Filmfare Awards South winners
Actresses in Telugu cinema
Actresses in Kannada cinema
Actresses in Hindi cinema
Year of birth missing (living people)
20th-century Indian actresses
21st-century Indian actresses
Indian film actresses